The Eurovision Young Dancers 2001 was the eighth edition of the Eurovision Young Dancers, held at the Linbury Studio Theatre of the Royal Opera House in London, United Kingdom between 18 and 23 June 2001. Organised by the European Broadcasting Union (EBU) and host broadcaster British Broadcasting Corporation (BBC), dancers from eleven countries participated in the televised final. A total of eighteen countries took part in the competition.  and  made their début while ,  and  returned.  and  withdrew from the contest, along with  who broadcast the event.

The semi-final that took place five days before the final (18 June 2001). Each country could send one or two performers, male and female, not older than 20, who could perform one or two dances. The dancers could choose between classical and contemporary dance.

The non-qualified countries were Austria, Ireland, Norway,  and Ukraine. David and Marcin Kupinski of Poland won the contest, with Belgium and Netherlands placing second and third respectively.

Location

The Linbury Studio Theatre of the Royal Opera House in London, United Kingdom was the host venue for the 2001 edition of the Eurovision Young Dancers.

The Linbury is most notable for hosting performances of experimental and independent dance and music, by independent companies and as part of the ROH2, the contemporary producing arm of the Royal Opera House. The Linbury Studio Theatre regularly stages performances by the Royal Ballet School and also hosts the Young British Dancer of the Year competition.

Format
The format consists of dancers who are non-professional and between the ages of 16–21, competing in a performance of dance routines of their choice, which they have prepared in advance of the competition. All of the acts then take part in a choreographed group dance during 'Young Dancers Week'.

Jury members of a professional aspect and representing the elements of ballet, contemporary, and modern dancing styles, score each of the competing individual and group dance routines. The overall winner upon completion of the final dances is chosen by the professional jury members.

The interval act was Symbiont(s) by Wayne McGregor.

Results

Preliminary round
A total of eighteen countries took part in the preliminary round of the 2001 contest, of which eleven qualified to the televised grand final. The following countries failed to qualify.

Final
Awards were given to the top three countries. The table below highlights these using gold, silver, and bronze. The placing results of the remaining participants is unknown and never made public by the European Broadcasting Union.

Jury members 
The jury members consisted of the following:

  – Matthew Bourne (Head of Jury)
  – Amanda Miller
  – Maina Gielgud
 / — Samuel Wuersten
  – Monique Veaute

Broadcasting
A total of 19 countries broadcast the 2001 event. France was the only country to broadcast the event without competing.

See also
 Eurovision Song Contest 2001

References

External links 
 

Eurovision Young Dancers by year
2001 in London
June 2001 events in Europe
Events in London